Louis-Thomas Villaret de Joyeuse (29 May 1747 – 24 July 1812) was a French admiral.

Villaret was born at Auch. After serving in the Indies under Suffren, he rose in rank during the early stages of the French Revolution. He was in command of the French fleet during the Glorious First of June, where despite being handed a heavy tactical defeat, he ensured the passage of a vital grain convoy to France. He led the French fleet during the disastrous Croisière du Grand Hiver and failed to prevent a British fleet from successfully retreating, with his last battle being a defeat off Groix. He was relieved when he refused to serve for the disastrous Expédition d'Irlande. Villaret was then elected at the Council of Five Hundred. He joined the Club de Clichy, a party promoting colonies and slavery, and harbouring Royalist sympathies. After the Coup of 18 Fructidor, Villaret was to be deported to Cayenne but went into hiding long enough for his sentence to be commuted to exile to Oléron, where he went willingly.

Reinstated in 1801, Villaret took command of the naval component of the Saint-Domingue expedition, and was appointed captain general of Martinique and Sainte-Lucie alongside the colonial prefect, Charles-Henri Bertin. He served in this capacity until the British captured Martinique in 1809. Returned to France, Villaret fell in disfavour for his perceived weak defence during the invasion. After two years, Napoléon pardoned him and appointed him governor of Venice. Villaret died there of edema on 24 July 1812.

Career
Louis-Thomas Villaret was born in Auch, in Gascony, to the family of a fiscal officer.

Unable to enter the elite naval schools, he entered the navy as a volontaire in 1768. Promoted to Lieutenant in 1773, he served as a lieutenant on the 32-gun frigate Atalante in the Indian Ocean. In 1778, unemployed in Pondicherry, he volunteered his services to the governor de Bellecombe during the siege of Pondicherry, earning the rank of capitaine de brûlot.

Service under Suffren
In 1781, Villaret commanded the fireship Pulvérisateur in Suffren's fleet.

He then served under Suffren, who made him his aide in 1782. He was later transferred to the frigate Dauphine, and became First Officer on Brillant in Suffren's squadron.

After the battle of Cuddalore on 20 June 1783, Suffren gave him command of the frigate Bellone.

A few months after, Suffren appointed Villaret to the 20-gun the corvette Naïade. He ordered him to sail to Madras and warn the French blockading squadron, composed of two ships of the line and two frigates, of the imminent arrival of a superior British force. Three days after her departure, on  11 April 1783, Naïade spotted the 64-gun HMS Sceptre, under Captain Graves; after trying without success to elude his much stronger opponent, Villaret was forced into battle, and struck his colours after a five-hour fight.  When Villaret surrendered his sword, Graves allegedly told him "Sir, you have given us a fairly beautiful frigate, but you made us pay dearly for her!"; some authors add that Graves returned Villaret his sword.

Villaret was taken prisoner. Despite the loss of Naïade, the British squadron was unable to locate the French ships, which had already departed. Naïade was not commissioned in the Royal Navy and was sold.

Villaret was released in June 1783, after the Treaty of Versailles, and was awarded him the Order of Saint Louis.

Villaret was promoted to Lieutenant in 1784 for his service. After the war, Villaret served in the harbour of Lorient.

French Revolution
In 1791, Villaret was appointed to command the frigate Prudente to transport troops to Saint-Domingue. Arriving shortly before the slave revolt that launched the Haitian Revolution, he helped the governor transport troops around the island.

On 14 March 1792, he swore the "civic oath" to the Republic, while his brother emigrated. Promoted to Captain in 1792, he was given the command of the 74-gun Trajan in 1793; in May 1793, part of a squadron under Morard de Galle, he was tasked with watching the coasts of Morbihan and Loire, to prevent the British from aiding the Revolt in the Vendée.

When the rest of the Brest fleet sailed to Belle-Isle and the Quibéron mutinies broke out among many ships in the fleet, Villaret was one of the few officers who maintained order aboard his ship.

In 1794, Villaret was promoted to Rear-admiral, and Jeanbon Saint André appointed him to command the 25-ship Brest fleet. Setting his flag on the 120-gun Montagne, Villaret reorganised and revitalised the Brest fleet. Among other measures, Saint André and Villaret-Joyeuse founded a naval artillery school.

Atlantic campaign of May 1794

In the summer of 1794, Villaret sailed with 23 ships of the line and 16 frigates to protect a 170-ship food convoy under Rear-admiral Vanstabel, incoming from the United States. The convoy was necessary to relieve France from famine after a disastrous harvest, and the British Channel Fleet under Admiral Lord Howe had set out to prevent it from reaching France; the orders of the National Convention to the fleet were to stall the British forces and prevent them from intercepting the convoy at all costs.

The Brest fleet departed and sailed to the Azores to wait for the arrival of Vanstabel's convoy. On 28 May, the French and British fleets came in contact 100 leagues off Ushant, and began seeking each other in the fog; the engagement culminated in the Glorious First of June. Although suffering severe losses, he rallied his remaining ships and rescued several of his ships; most importantly, the grain convoy reached Brest unmolested.

Supported by Saint-André, Villaret-Joyeuse kept his command despite the tactical defeat. He blamed his losses on the conduct of several of his captains who had failed to fulfil their duties. On 27 September 1794, Villaret-Joyeuse was promoted to Vice-admiral.

Croisière du Grand Hiver
In December, the Committee of Public Safety ordered him to attack British commerce in the Croisière du Grand Hiver. Although the cruise did lead to the capture of a number of British merchant ships, the French fleet was battered by storms in which several ships were sunk and all the surviving ships suffered heavy damage.

Battle of Groix
In June 1795, he sailed with nine ships to relieve a small squadron near Belle Île. During Cornwallis's Retreat, Villaret-Joyeuse tried to engage the small British squadron blockading Belle Île. Unable to bring them to battle, Villaret attempted to return to Brest, but contrary winds forced him towards Lorient. Close to Lorient, Villaret-Joyeuse was discovered by British admiral Alexander Hood's fleet, guarding the expedition to Quiberon. During Second Battle of Groix, several of Villaret's ships disobeyed his orders and sailed away, with three ships of the line being captured by the British.

In 1796, Villaret-Joyeuse was appointed to command the fleet for the Expédition d'Irlande, an attempt to land General Hoche's army in Ireland; opposed to the project, Villaret was replaced with Morard de Galle.

Political career
In 1796, Villaret was elected to the Council of Five Hundred as a representative of Morbihan. As a member of the Club de Clichy, then considered to constitute the Royalist party, he gave several speeches about the colonies, speaking against the emancipation of slaves. He also lobbied in favour of strengthening the Navy.

After the Coup of 18 Fructidor, Villaret was sentenced to deportation to Cayenne; he went into hiding until the French Directory ordered those who had escaped deportation to Guyane exiled to the Île d'Oléron; then, Villaret willingly surrendered himself. He remained on Oléron until the advent of the French Consulate.

Saint-Domingue expedition and Martinique

In 1801, Bonaparte ended Villaret-Joyeuse's exile and returned him to active command. Initially, Napoleon wanted Villaret-Joyeuse to prepare an expedition to capture the Cape of Good Hope, then head into the Indian Ocean. With the Peace of Amiens, Bonaparte decided to attempt to regain control of Haiti with the Saint-Domingue expedition. In December 1801, Villaret set out with ten French and five Spanish ships and nine frigates and corvettes, with his flag on the 120-gun Océan, ferrying 7000 of General Leclerc's expeditionary forces to Saint Domingue. Two further squadron, one from Lorient comprising one ship, two frigates and 1200 soldiers, and the other from Rochefort with six ships, six frigates, two corvettes and 3000 soldiers, joined his fleet off Brest. Conflicts over command led Villaret to return to France with the majority of the fleet.

In April 1802, Bonaparte appointed Villaret him "Capitaine-General of Martinique and Sainte-Lucie". Taking control of Martinique in September in accordance with the Treaty of Amiens, he faced the threats of slave-uprisings, yellow fever and the possibility of invasion. On 3 November 1802, Villared founded a 94-strong force of Gendarmerie at Martinique, and on 8 July 1803, a company of black Chasseurs Volontaires de la Martinique.

He cooperated with Admirals Missiessy and Villeneuve who sailed into the Caribbean in 1805 during the Trafalgar Campaign.

In January 1809, a British expedition invaded Martinique and laid siege to the fortress at Fort-de-France. After the British were able to bring up their heavy artillery, the month-long siege ended on 24 February with the surrender of Villaret.

Upon his return to France, Villaret's conduct was condemned by an inquiry council; he requested in vain a Court-martial to clear his name, and he lived in disgrace for two years. Napoleon granted him a pardon in 1811: "Bravery and fidelity plead in favour of the vice-admiral (...) did his faults lose the colony? At most, they shortened its keeping for a few days." As Napoleon prepared for the invasion of Russia, he appointed Villaret General governor of Venice in the Napoleonic Kingdom of Italy, and commander of the 12th military division. Villaret retained this position until 24 July 1812, when he died of edema in Venice.

To honour him, Napoleon had his name engraved on the Arc de Triomphe in Paris.

Legacy
A number of legends have been reported as truths on Villart-Joyeuse. He is often said to have come from a noble family; this appears to be false.

Another legend holds that he enlisted in the Gendarmes before joining the Navy; however, Villaret is listed on none of the lists of Gendarmes in the relevant years. Some authors further state that Villaret had to leave the Gendarmes after killing an opponent in a duel, either and the age of 16 or at the age of 18.

Honours

Knight of the Order of Saint Louis – 15 July 1783
Knight of the Legion of Honour – 11 October 1803
Grand Officer of the Legion of Honour - 14 June 1804
Grand Cordon of the Legion of Honour – 2 February 1805

Notes and references

Notes

References

Bibliography 
 
 
 
 
 

French Navy admirals
Joyeuse, Louis Thomas, Villaret de
1750 births
1812 deaths
Deaths from edema
Grand Officiers of the Légion d'honneur
Grand Crosses of the Order of Saint Louis
French Governors of Martinique
Names inscribed under the Arc de Triomphe